The women's triple jump event at the 2006 Commonwealth Games was held on March 21.

Results

References
Results

Triple
2006
2006 in women's athletics